Joakim Hagelin (born April 30, 1989) is a Swedish ice hockey player. He is currently playing with Västerviks IK of the HockeyAllsvenskan.

Hagelin made his Swedish Hockey League debut playing with Linköpings HC during the 2013–14 SHL season.

References

External links

1989 births
Living people
Linköping HC players
Swedish ice hockey forwards
Sportspeople from Linköping
Djurgårdens IF Hockey players
Västerviks IK players
AIK IF players